Zhang Meng (born 17 February 1983) is a Chinese former footballer.

Career statistics

Club

Notes

References

1983 births
Living people
Chinese footballers
Chinese expatriate footballers
Association football defenders
Singapore Premier League players
Hong Kong Premier League players
Tuen Mun SA players
Chinese expatriate sportspeople in Singapore
Expatriate footballers in Singapore
Chinese expatriate sportspeople in Hong Kong
Expatriate footballers in Hong Kong